Dural is a suburb of Sydney, in the state of New South Wales, Australia 36 kilometres north-west of the Sydney central business district in the local government areas of Hornsby Shire and The Hills Shire. Dural is part of the Hills District. Round Corner is a locality in the south-western part of Dural.

History
The original inhabitants of the Dural area were the Darug people. Dural is derived from Dooral-Dooral, an Aboriginal name meaning a smoking hollow tree.

The name Dooral appeared on Surveyor Richard Dundiate's map of April 1817 and originally covered the whole area including present day Glenorie, Galston, Arcadia and Middle Dural. Located on the Old Northern Road, a historic road built by convicts between 1825 and 1836 to link early Sydney, in the Colony of New South Wales, with the fertile Hunter Valley to the north. The first grant in the area was made to George Hall in 1879. At an earlier stage, a local settler, James Roughley, had donated land to be used for the building of a church. A sandstone chapel was built on Old Northern Road circa 1846, with a vestry, apse and shingle roof, plus a bell turret on the western gable. A porch was added soon after. The chapel—known as St Jude's Church—is now listed on the Register of the National Estate.

Dural Post Office opened on 1 August 1864.

Population
According to the 2016 census, there were 7,570 residents in Dural.  66.6% of people were born in Australia. The next most common countries of birth were England 4.4%, China 2.7%, South Africa 2.0%, India 1.9% and Malaysia 1.6%. 72.8% of people spoke only English at home. Other languages spoken at home included Mandarin 3.9%, Cantonese 2.7%, Arabic 2.5% and Italian 1.7%. The most common responses for religion in Dural were Catholic 29.4%, No Religion 21.2% and Anglican 17.9%. The median household income was $2,160 a day a fair bit higher than the national median of $1,438 per month 82.3% of occupied dwellings were separate houses and 63.4% of houses had 4 or more bedrooms. There was a high level of home ownership in Dural, with 82.2% of people either owning their house outright or owning with a mortgage.

Schools
Lorien Novalis School
 Dural Public School
Redfield College
Pacific Hills Christian School
Warrah Rudolf Steiner School
Middle Dural Public School

Sport and recreation
Dural plays host to the Dural Rugby Club, Dural Country Club, Dural Country Club soccer teams, Redfield Lions Soccer and Rugby Clubs and the Pacific Hills Pumas Soccer Club.
Dural Rugby Club organises Wallatag in the Summer Months which is held on a Friday night at Bernie Mullane Sports Complex in Kellyville.
 Hills Hawks Junior Rugby League Football Club has its home ground at Dural Park, Quarry Road Dural

Transport
Dural has no railway station but is connected to Castle Hill metro station and Pennant Hills railway station via bus services operated by Hillsbus. A Hillsbus depot is located on New Line Road next to McDonald's.

Media
Between 1985 and 1987, Dural was the site for tapings of the television game show It's a Knockout shown nationally on the Ten Network and hosted by Billy J Smith and Fiona MacDonald. However, due to numerous complaints from local residents the show was cancelled in 1987.
Dural was also the setting for the home of the wealthy Hamilton family, at 631 Old Northern Road, in the soap opera Sons And Daughters during its 1981–1987 run. Le Chateau, a landmark manor house in Dural was host to the set of Beauty and The Geek, a similar theme of television show to The Bachelor. The Le Chateau is now owned by Harach Lucas, founder and CEO of MicroChannel.

Communications

Quarry Road is home to the Amateur Radio New South Wales clubrooms, library, and broadcasting site.

References

External links
  [CC-By-SA]

Suburbs of Sydney
The Hills Shire
Hornsby Shire